The golden-crowned manakin (Lepidothrix vilasboasi) is a small species of perching bird in the manakin family (Pipridae). It is endemic to the south-central Amazon Rainforest in Brazil, and it is threatened by habitat loss.

Discovery and recovery
Helmut Sick described this species in 1959 based on a series of specimens collected a few years before near a small tributary of the upper Rio Cururu-ri in the east Brazilian Amazon. The species was only rediscovered (in part due to confusion over the original type locality) in 2002 and is now known from a number of locations in an area bordered by the Jamanxim and Tapajos rivers and the Cachimbo Range.

Hybrid speciation
Genomic analyses indicates that the species is of hybrid origin between the opal-crowned manakin and snow-capped manakin and may represent one of a few cases of hybrid species in birds. The golden-crowned manakin closely resembles both its parent species with the exception of its unique yellow crown. The white crown of the snow-capped manakin and the opalescent crown of the opal-crowned manakin represent structural colours produced by different nanostructural organizations of the feather barb keratin matrix.

The yellow crown of the golden-crowned manakin is intermediate between the two parent species which is thought to have disrupted the structural mechanisms of the parents leading to the much duller look of its crown. Following hybridization, sexual selection is proposed to have favored sequestration of yellow producing carotenoid pigments into the crown as a way to render males more attractive to females.

References

External links
 

 

golden-crowned manakin
Birds of the Amazon Basin
Endemic birds of Brazil
golden-crowned manakin
golden-crowned manakin
Taxonomy articles created by Polbot